The 2017 Americas Rugby Championship was the second series of the Americas Rugby Championship (sometimes informally called the "Americas Six Nations", a reference to Europe's Six Nations Championship), which is the top elite tournament for the Americas nations. It was contested by Argentina XV (Argentina's secondary national team), Canada, United States, Uruguay, Brazil, and Chile. All matches were full international test matches with caps awarded, except those involving Argentina XV.

Participants

Table

Squads

Fixtures
The tournament was played in a round-robin format, with each team playing the five others once. The fixtures were announced on 6 September 2016.

Week 1

Notes:
 This was Brazil's first victory over Chile since 2014, and their largest margin of victory over Chile in their history.
 Josh Reeves and De Wet van Niekerk made their international debuts for Brazil.
 Vittorio Lastra, Nicanor Machuca, Gonzalo Martínez and Franco Velarde made their international debuts for Chile.

Notes:
 Ben Cima, Matthew Jensen, Will Magie, Peter Malcolm, Alex Maughan and Dino Waldren made their international debuts for the United States.
 Francisco Berchesi, Felipe Inciarte, Rodolfo Garese and Diego Pombo made their international debuts for Uruguay.

Week 2

Notes:
 Spike Davis and Peter Tiberio made their international debuts for the United States.

Notes:
 This was Canada's 100th test victory.
 Martín Mendoza and Arturo Seeman made their international debuts for Chile.
 George Barton, Matt Beukeboom, Giuseppe Du Toit, Cole Keith, Conor Keys, Oliver Nott, Reegan O'Gorman and Robbie Povey made their international debuts for Canada.

Week 3

Notes:
 Matheus Rocha, Ariel Rodrigues and Endy Willian made their international debuts for Brazil.
 Manuel Diana and Lorenzo Surraco made their international debuts for Uruguay.

Notes:
 Lucas Albornoz made his international debut for Canada.
 Siaosi Mahoni made his international debut for the United States.
 The 51 points scored by the United States are the most pointed conceded by Canada on home soil against the Eagles.

Week 4

Notes:
 Andrew Turner and Calvin Whiting made their international debuts for the United States.

Notes:
First international test played in Tierra del Fuego by an Argentinean national side.

Notes:
 Kainoa Lloyd made his international debut for Canada.
 This was Uruguay' largest winning margin over Canada, surpassing their only ever other victory of Canada (25–23) set in 2002.

Week 5

Notes:
 This was Brazil's first ever victory over Canada.

Notes:
 Diego Magno surpassed Rodrigo Sánchez' record of 67 caps to become Uruguay's most capped player with 68 caps.

Statistics

Top points scorers

Top try scorers

Attendances (2016-2017)

Top 5

Average home attendances

Table (2016-2017)

References

External links

2017
2017 rugby union tournaments for national teams
2017 in Canadian rugby union
rugby union
rugby union
rugby union
2017 in American rugby union
2017 in Argentine rugby union
2017 in North American rugby union
2017 in South American rugby union